Noble Consort Wan (1 February 1716 – 10 March 1807), of the Han Chinese Chen clan, was a consort of the Qianlong Emperor. She was five years his junior.

Life

Family background
Noble Consort Wan's personal name was not recorded in history.

 Father: Tingzhang

Kangxi era
The future Noble Consort Wan was born on the 20th day of the 12th lunar month in the 55th year of the reign of the Kangxi Emperor, which translates to 1 February 1717 in the Gregorian calendar.

Yongzheng era
It is not known when Lady Chen became a mistress of Hongli, the fourth son of the Yongzheng Emperor.

Qianlong era
The Yongzheng Emperor died on 8 October 1735 and was succeeded by Hongli, who was enthroned as the Qianlong Emperor. On 8 November 1735, Lady Chen was granted the title "First Attendant". She was elevated in 1737 to "Noble Lady", in May or June 1749 to "Concubine Wan", and in December 1794 or January 1795 to "Consort Wan". She didn't give birth to any children.

Jiaqing era
The Qianlong Emperor died on 7 February 1799. His 15th son, the Jiaqing Emperor, elevated Lady Chen to "Dowager Noble Consort Wan" on 27 May 1801. In his imperial edict, the Jiaqing Emperor mentioned that Lady Chen deserved the honour because she had served his father for a long time and was still in good health at a very old age.

Lady Chen died on 10 March 1807 and was interred in the Yu Mausoleum of the Eastern Qing tombs. She was the longest surviving consort of the Qianlong Emperor at the time of her death.

Titles
 During the reign of the Kangxi Emperor (r. 1661–1722):
 Lady Chen (from 1 February 1717)
 During the reign of the Yongzheng Emperor (r. 1722–1735):
 Mistress
 During the reign of the Qianlong Emperor (r. 1735–1796):
 First Attendant (from 8 November 1735), seventh rank consort
 Noble Lady (from 1737), sixth rank consort
 Concubine Wan (from May/June 1749), fifth rank consort
 Consort Wan (from December 1794 or January 1795), fourth rank consort
 During the reign of the Jiaqing Emperor (r. 1796–1820):
 Dowager Noble Consort Wan (from 27 May 1801), third rank consort

In fiction and popular culture
 Portrayed by Wang Xinhui in Story of Yanxi Palace (2018)
 Portrayed by Cao Xiwen in Ruyi's Royal Love in the Palace (2018)

See also
 Ranks of imperial consorts in China#Qing
 Royal and noble ranks of the Qing dynasty

Notes

References
 

1717 births
1807 deaths
Consorts of the Qianlong Emperor